KJCS may refer to:

 KJCS (FM), a radio station (103.3 FM) licensed to Nacogdoches, Texas, United States
 KJCS-LD, a low-power television station (channel 14, virtual channel 38) licensed to Colorado Springs, Colorado, United States